Coraliomargarita sinensis is a Gram-negative and obligately aerobic bacterium from the genus of Coraliomargarita which has been isolated from a marine solar saltern from the coast of Weihai.

References

Verrucomicrobiota
Bacteria described in 2019